Pacific Conservatory Theatre (PCPA) is a presenting and training professional residential theatre company in Santa Maria, California, offering a two-year acting and technical theatre conservatory program, operating out of Allan Hancock College.

Degree
Onstage and offstage, PCPA’s Conservatory provides specialized training for its students. The two-year vocational certificate program combines lectures, labs, and classes with the practical hands-on training which students learn when mounting a fully realized production. Conservatory students are mentored by practicing professionals in the classroom.

For actors, the comprehensive curriculum offers no elective subjects. It is a full-time, six-days-a-week commitment. Classes include Acting, Voice, Movement, Musical Theatre Ensemble, Shakespeare, Theatre History, Stage Combat and more. The technical theatre students examine all aspects of production enabling them to develop as designers, craftspeople and technicians. Their areas of study include Stagecraft, Lighting, Sound, Drawing and Rendering, Costuming and Scene Painting.

Alumni
Over the years, PCPA’s conservatory alumni have gone on to become distinguished theatrical professionals. Former members of the school include:

 Robin Williams 
 Mercedes Ruehl
 Kathy Bates
 Jeffrey Combs
 Harry Hamlin
 Kelly McGillis
 James Marsters
 Boyd Gaines
 Zac Efron
 Scott Aukerman
 Vincent Rodriguez III
Powers Boothe
Richard Riehle

Support
PCPA receives operating funds from the Allan Hancock College, an endowment, ticket revenue, and the fundraising efforts of the PCPA Foundation to secure corporate and individual donations.

References

External links

Music schools in California
Drama schools in the United States
Santa Maria, California
Education in Santa Barbara County, California